Una luz en mi camino is a 1939 Mexican drama film directed by José Bohr. It stars Narciso Busquets, Consuelo Frank, Virginia Fábregas and Pedro Armendáriz.

References

External links
 

1939 films
Mexican drama films
1939 drama films
Mexican black-and-white films
1930s Spanish-language films
Films directed by José Bohr
1930s Mexican films